Albert John Cook (born in Owosso, Michigan on August 30, 1842; died in Owosso on September 29, 1916) was an entomologist and zoologist.

He spent much of his life in Michigan and graduated from the State Agricultural College, present-day Michigan State University, in 1862.
In 1867 he established the Collection of Insects at the College. As an instructor at State Agricultural College, he was extensively involved in beekeeping, where he lectured on apiculture and published a pamphlet called The Manual of the Apiary in 1876, which was eventually expanded into a textbook and went through at least seventeen editions.

He also spent many years in California as he taught at Pomona College from 1894 to 1911 and after this headed California's Commission of Horticulture.

He died in his childhood home in 1916.

Bibliography
Manual of the apiary. Chicago: Newman & Son (1880).
Wintering bees. Lansing: Agricultural College of Michigan (1885).
Report of apicultural experiments in 1891. (1892).
The Bee-Keeper's Guide; or Manual of the Apiary. (17th ed.) Chicago: Newman & Son (1902).

References

External links

1842 births
1916 deaths
American entomologists
Michigan State University alumni
Pomona College faculty
People from Owosso, Michigan
Scientists from California